Kedyw (partial acronym of Kierownictwo Dywersji ("Directorate of Diversion") was a Polish World War II Home Army unit that conducted active and passive sabotage, propaganda and armed operations against Nazi German forces and collaborators.

Operations

Kedyw was created on January 22, 1943, from two pre-existing Armia Krajowa organisations:  Związek Odwetu (Association of Retaliation), and Wachlarz. Initially, the units were small and town-based.  Eventually, as more were formed, some moved into forested areas to begin partisan warfare. Kedyw organized weapon and munition factories, military schools, intelligence, counter-intelligence, field hospitals and a communication network.

Most members of Kedyw were Boy Scouts from Związek Harcerstwa Polskiego and its wartime organisation, Szare Szeregi. Many of the officers were cichociemni, who were special agents trained in the United Kingdom and parachuted into occupied Poland. Selected Kedyw groups (patrole) carried out operations all over occupied Poland. Notable types of operations included:
 the sabotaging of railways, bridges and roads
 the burning of trains and fuel depots
 the destruction or damaging of weapon factories working for the Wehrmacht
 the liberation of hundreds of prisoners and hostages
 a famous such operation took place on March 26, 1943 and is known as "Akcja pod Arsenałem"
 executions of Nazi collaborators and traitors sentenced by an underground court
 one of them involved Igo Sym, a Polish actor who had been informing the Germans about Home Army operations
 executions of particularly-brutal individuals among the German occupation troops, Gestapo, SS and police known as Operation Heads
 those executed included SS and police General Franz Kutschera, killed on February 2, 1944, SS-Hauptscharfuhrer August Kretschmann, commandant of the Gęsiówka concentration camp, SS-Rottenführer Ewald Lange, SS-Obersturmführer Herbert Schultz, SS-Oberscharführer Franz Bürkl and many others (more than 2,000 people). Such individuals were officially sentenced to death for their crimes by the Polish Underground State court, which was delivered to those individuals. Many could not stand the pressure and returned to Reich.
 Operation Belt

Warsaw Uprising
Prior to the Warsaw Uprising, most of the Kedyw units in the Warsaw area were moved into the city and grouped into infantry battalions. Notable among them were "Zośka", "Parasol" and "Miotła". After fighting broke out, most of the Kedyw forces joined the Radosław Group. Kedyw units were among the most successful in the Uprising. The boy scouts not only had more experience than many regular soldiers but also had managed to collect more supplies and arms.

Kedyw units first took part in seizing control of Warsaw's Wola district. After two days of heavy fighting in the Powązki Cemetery in which all German attacks were repulsed with heavy casualties, the units withdrew overnight to the city centre and Starówka (the old town), where they regrouped and defended their sectors until the capitulation of the uprising in October 1944.

Commanders
 Brigadier-General Emil August Fieldorf (Nil) (until March 1944)
 Jan Mazurkiewicz (Radosław) (until August 1944)

Bibliography
HENRYK WITKOWSKI "KEDYW" OKRĘGU WARSZAWSKIEGO ARMII KRAJOWEJ W LATACH 1943 - 1944", Instytut Wydawniczy Związków Zawodowych 1985,
Rybicka Hanna "Kedyw okręgu Warszawa Armii Krajowej Dokumenty - rok 1944", Wydawnictwa Uniwersytetu Warszawskiego 2009, 
Drzyzga Bernard "Kedyw Okręgu AK Łódź i 60 Pułk AK", 1988,
Jan Gozdawa-Gołębiowski "Kedyw "Białowieży", Książka i Wiedza 1990,

See also

 Armia Krajowa
 Cichociemni
 Polish Secret State
 Kotwica

References

 Struktura Organizacyjna Armii Krajowej, Marek Ney-Krwawicz w: Mówią wieki nr 9/1986.

Units and formations of the Home Army
Scouting and Guiding in Poland
Military units and formations established in 1943
1943 establishments in Poland